Alexander Marcus (born 26 July 1972 in Berlin as Felix Rennefeld) is a German music producer. He became popular in Germany after producing and uploading a series of videos to YouTube.

Biography 
According to Marcus, his parents got divorced shortly after his birth. They sent him to live with his grandmother in the countryside, where he took part in the popular children's dance group "Edelweißchen". At eighteen he went to the US and lived in New York and Miami, and while there experienced international and electronic music. It was here that he formed the idea to combine this music style with aspects of German folk music and Schlager. He has been living in Berlin since 2005. On 6 June 2008 he released his debut album Electrolore with Kontor Records, which included guest contributions by Manny Marc and Frauenarzt.

Style 
Alexander Marcus' music is a mixture of modern electronic club music and folk music, which he has named 'Electrolore', a Portmanteau of 'electro' and 'folklore'. He exaggerates many of the clichés present in German Schlager music, often complementing them with "trashy" objects in his music videos, such as a recurrent plastic globe he nicknamed "Globi". Spiegel Online sees him as a typical example of a return to pop-art social criticism. Never breaking out of character, Rennefeld leaves the question of whether the character is a parody unanswered:  2008 Alexander Marcus was on tour as support act for And One.

Discography

Albums 
 2008: Electrolore (released on Kontor Records, with DVD)
 2009: Mega
 2012: Glanz & Gloria
 2014: Kristall
 2017: 10 Jahre Electrolore – Das ultimative Album
 2019: "Pharao"

Guest contributions
2008: Tanz den Tanz on Die Türen-Remix-Album Booty
2008: Florida Lady on Atzen Musik Vol. 1 by Frauenarzt and Manny Marc
2009: Nessaja on Hands on Scooter by Scooter

References

External links 
 
 Felix Rennfeld Discogs

1972 births
Living people
German male singer-songwriters
German singer-songwriters
German record producers
Singers from Berlin
21st-century German guitarists